Defensive pessimism is a cognitive strategy in which an individual sets a low expectation for their performance, regardless of how well they have done in the past. Individuals use defensive pessimism as a strategy to prepare for anxiety-provoking events or performances.  Defensive pessimists then think through specific negative events and setbacks that could adversely influence their goal pursuits. By envisioning possible negative outcomes, defensive pessimists can take action to avoid or prepare for them. Using this strategy, defensive pessimists can advantageously harness anxiety that might otherwise harm their performance.

Defensive pessimism is utilized in a variety of domains, and public speaking provides a good example of the process involved in this strategy. Defensive pessimists could alleviate their anxiety over public speaking by imagining possible obstacles such as forgetting the speech, being thirsty, or staining their shirts before the event. Because defensive pessimists have thought of these problems, they can appropriately prepare to face the challenges ahead. The speaker could, for instance, create note cards with cues about the speech, place a cup of water on the podium to alleviate thirst, and bring a bleach pen to remove shirt stains. These preventive actions both reduce anxiety and promote superior performance.

Defensive pessimism was identified by Nancy Cantor and her students in the mid-1980s.

Strategy effectiveness
Though defensive pessimists are less satisfied with their performances and rate themselves higher in "need for improvement," they do not actually perform worse than people with a more optimistic strategy. Norem and Cantor (1986) investigated whether encouraging defensive pessimists, and thereby interfering with their typical negative thinking, would result in worse performances. Participants in the study were in either encouragement or non-encouragement scenarios as they prepared to complete anagram and puzzle tasks. In the encouragement condition, the defensive pessimists were told that, based on their GPA, they should expect to do well. Defensive pessimists performed worse when encouraged than the defensive pessimists whose strategy was not manipulated. Defensive pessimism is an adaptive strategy for those who struggle with anxiety: their performance decreases if they are unable to appropriately manage and counteract their anxiety.

Key components

Prefactual thinking

Prefactual (i.e., "before the fact") thinking is an essential component of defensive pessimism. Synonymous with anticipation, it denotes a cognitive strategy in which people imagine possible outcomes of a future scenario. The term prefactual was specifically coined by Lawrence J. Sanna, in 1998, to denote those activities that speculate on possible future outcomes, given the present, and ask "What will be the outcome if event E occurs?"

The imagined outcomes are either positive/desirable, negative/undesirable, or neutral. Prefactual thinking can be advantageous because it allows the individual to prepare for possible outcomes of a scenario.

For defensive pessimists, prefactual thinking offers the primary and critical method to alleviate anxiety. Usually, this prefactual thinking is paired with a pessimistic outlook, resulting in negative/undesirable imagined scenarios. With regard to the earlier example, the public speaking defensive pessimist anticipates forgetting the speech or becoming thirsty as opposed to giving an amazing speech and receiving a standing ovation.

Anxiety
As defensive pessimism is motivated by a need to manage anxiety, it is unsurprisingly also correlated with trait anxiety and neuroticism. Negative mood states promote defensive pessimists' goal attainment strategy by facilitating the generation of potential setbacks and negative outcomes that could arise during goal pursuit, which can then be anticipated and prevented. When defensive pessimists are encouraged into positive or even just neutral mood states, they perform worse on experimental tasks than when in a negative mood state. They are more anxious because they are prevented from properly implementing their preferred cognitive strategy for goal attainment.

Self-esteem
Defensive pessimism is generally related to lower self-esteem since the strategy involves self-criticism, pessimism, and discounting previous successful performances. Indeed, Norem and Burdzovic Andreas (2006) found that, compared to optimists, defensive pessimists had lower self-esteem entering college. At the end of four years of college, however, the self-esteem of the defensive pessimists had increased to nearly equal levels as optimists. The self-esteem of optimists had not changed, and the self-esteem of pessimists who did not employ defensive pessimism had fallen slightly by the end of college. While defensive pessimism may have implications for self-esteem, it appears that these effects lessen over time.

Compared to pessimism
Unlike pessimism, defensive pessimism is not an internal, global, and stable attribution style, but rather a cognitive strategy utilized within the context of certain goals. Pessimism involves rumination about possible negative outcomes of a situation without proactive behavior to counteract these outcomes. Defensive pessimism, on the other hand, utilizes the foresight of negative situations in order to prepare against them. The negative possible outcomes of a situation often motivate defensive pessimists to work harder for success. Since defensive pessimists are anxious, but not certain, that negative situations will arise, they still feel that they can control their outcomes. For example, a defensive pessimist would not avoid all job interviews for fear of failing one. Instead, a defensive pessimist would anticipate possible challenges that could come in an upcoming job interview – such as dress code, stubborn interviewers, and tough questions – and prepare rigorously to face them. Defensive pessimism is not a reaction to stressful events nor does it entail ruminating on events of the past, and should therefore be distinguished from pessimism as a trait or a more general negative outlook. Instead, defensive pessimists are able to stop using this strategy once it is no longer beneficial (i.e., does not serve a preparatory role).

Compared to other cognitive strategies

Self-handicapping
Elliot and Church (2003) determined that people adopt defensive pessimism or self-handicapping strategies for the same reason: to deal with anxiety-provoking situations. Self-handicapping is a cognitive strategy in which people construct obstacles to their own success to keep failure from damaging their self-esteem. The difference between self-handicapping and defensive pessimism lies in the motivation behind the strategies. Beyond managing anxiety, defensive pessimism is further motivated by a desire for high achievement. Self-handicappers, however, feel no such need. Elliot and Church found that the self-handicapping strategy undermined goal achievement while defensive pessimism aided achievement. People who self-handicapped were high in avoidance motivation and low in approach motivation. They wanted to avoid anxiety but were not motivated to approach success. Defensive pessimists, on the other hand, were motivated to approach success and goal attainment while simultaneously avoiding the anxiety associated with performance. Although it was found that defensive pessimism was positively correlated with goals related to both performance-avoidance and anxiety-avoidance, it was not found to be a predictor of one's mastery of goals.

Strategic optimism
In research, defensive pessimism is frequently contrasted with strategic optimism, another cognitive strategy. When facing performance situations, strategic optimists feel that they will end well. Therefore, though they plan ahead, they plan only minimally because they do not have any anxiety to face. While defensive pessimists set low expectations, feel anxious, and rehearse possible negative outcomes of situations, strategic optimists set high expectations, feel calm, and do not reflect on the situation any more than absolutely necessary. Strategic optimists start out with different motivations and obstacles: unlike defensive pessimists, strategic optimists do not have any anxiety to surmount. In spite of their differences in motivation, strategic optimists and defensive pessimists have similar objective performance outcomes. For both strategic optimists and defensive pessimists, their respective cognitive strategies are adaptive and promote success.

See also

Footnotes

References 
 Sanna, L.J., "Defensive Pessimism and Optimism: The Bitter-Sweet Influence of Mood on Performance and Prefactual and Counterfactual Thinking", Cognition and Emotion, Vol.12, No.5, (September 1998), pp.635-665.
 Yeates, L.B., Thought Experimentation: A Cognitive Approach,  Graduate Diploma in Arts (By Research) dissertation, University of New South Wales, 2004.

Further reading
Norem, J. (2001). The Positive Power of Negative Thinking. Cambridge, MA: Basic Books

Defence mechanisms
Motivation
Thought experiments